Han Pengfei (born 28 April 1993) is a Chinese professional footballer who currently plays for Chinese Super League club Changchun Yatai.

Club career
Han Pengfei started his football career when he joined Dalian Shide's youth academy in 2008. On 1 July 2013, he moved to Campeonato Nacional side Mafra after Dalian was dissolved. He made his debut for the club on 25 August 2013 in a 2–0 win against Atlético Riachense.

On 18 January 2016, Han transferred to Chinese Super League side Guangzhou Evergrande Taobao. On 26 July 2016, he made his debut for the club in a 2–1 away win against Beijing Guoan in the 2016 Chinese FA Cup, coming on as a substitute for Feng Xiaoting in the 81st minute. He made his Super League debut four days later on 30 July 2016, playing the whole match in a 2–1 home win over Henan Jianye.

On 24 February 2017, Han was loaned to Super League newcomer Guizhou Hengfeng Zhicheng for one season. On 3 March 2017, he made his debut for Guizhou in the first 2017 Chinese Super League match against Liaoning FC. He committed a foul to concede a penalty which was scored by James Chamanga, as Guizhou Zhicheng tied with Liaoning 1–1. On 14 October 2017, Han scored his first senior goal in a 3–2 home defeat to Changchun Yatai. On 28 February 2018, he made a permanent transfer to Guizhou Hengfeng with a one-year contract.

On 30 January 2019, Han transferred to Super League newcomer Wuhan Zall. He would make his debut on 1 March 2019 against Beijing Sinobo Guoan F.C. in a league game that ended in a 1-0 defeat.

Career statistics

Honours

Club 
Mafra
Campeonato Nacional: 2014-15

Guangzhou Evergrande
Chinese Super League: 2016
Chinese FA Cup: 2016
Chinese FA Super Cup: 2016

References

External links
 

1993 births
Living people
Chinese footballers
Association football defenders
Liga Portugal 2 players
Chinese Super League players
C.D. Mafra players
Guangzhou F.C. players
Guizhou F.C. players
Wuhan F.C. players
Chinese expatriate footballers
Expatriate footballers in Portugal
Chinese expatriate sportspeople in Portugal
Footballers at the 2014 Asian Games
Asian Games competitors for China